The 12th Pan American Games were held in Mar del Plata, Argentina from March 11 to March 25, 1995.

Medals

Bronze

Men's Light Flyweight (– 48 kg): Geovany Baca

Women's Flyweight (– 45 kg): Dora Maldonado

Results by event

See also
 Honduras at the 1996 Summer Olympics

Nations at the 1995 Pan American Games
P
1995